Lake Brienz is a lake just north of the Alps, in the canton of Bern in Switzerland. It flows out into a further stretch of the Aare at its western end. The culminating point of the lake's drainage basin is the Finsteraarhorn at 4,274 metres above sea level.

The village of Brienz, from which the lake takes its name, lies on the northern shore to its eastern end. In the west, the lake is terminated by the Bödeli, a tongue of land that separates it from neighbouring Lake Thun. The village of Bönigen occupies the lake frontage of the Bödeli, whilst the larger resort town of Interlaken lies on the reach of the Aare between the two lakes. The village of Iseltwald lies on the south shore, whilst the villages of Ringgenberg, Niederried and Oberried are on the north shore.

The lake is poor in nutrients, and consequently, fishing is not very important. Nevertheless, in 2001 10,000 kg fish were caught.

There have been passenger ships on the lake since 1839, and currently there are five passenger ships on the lake. The ships also connect to the Giessbachbahn, a funicular which climbs up to the famous Giessbach Falls.

The Brünig railway line follows the northern shore of the lake, along with a local road, whilst the A8 motorway adopts an alternative and mostly tunnelled route above the southern shore.

References

External links

Shipping pages from BLS AG web site

Ökosystem Brienzersee  interdisciplinary study of the ecosystem
Waterlevels at Ringgenberg from the Swiss Federal Office for the Environment

 
Brienz
Bernese Oberland
LBrienz
Brienz
Brienz